Lynne Yelich,  (née Zdunich; born March 24, 1953) is a Canadian politician and was the Conservative MP for the former riding of Blackstrap and predecessor riding components, from 2000 to 2015.

Life and career
Yelich was born in Saskatoon, Saskatchewan. She is a third-generation Croatian-Canadian. The riding of Blackstrap included Yelich's home town of Kenaston, Saskatchewan, identified as the largest Croatian farming settlement in Canada. Yelich was first elected to the House of Commons of Canada in 2000 and was re-elected in 2004, 2006, 2008 and 2011.

At the time of the 2005 dissolution of the 38th Parliament, Lynne Yelich was cited by Carol Goar as one of six Members of Parliament who had "tried to use the legislative system to improve the lives of Canadians" and who deserved "credit for attempting to play a positive role in a House consumed by partisan machinations".

Subsequent to the election of the Conservative minority government in 2006, Yelich was appointed by Prime Minister Stephen Harper as the Parliamentary Secretary to the Minister of Human Resources and Social Development. She was appointed Minister of State (Western Economic Diversification) by Harper following the re-election of the Conservative minority government in 2008. Yelich was last appointed Minister of State (Foreign Affairs and Consular) in July 2013.

During her Parliamentary tenure, Yelich served on the Citizenship & Immigration, Transport, Government Operations & Estimates, and Status of Women committees.  She was also a member of the Standing Committee on Human Resources and Social Development and the Status of Persons with Disabilities (HUMA). She also served as Critic for Women Entrepreneurs, Families and Caregivers, Status of Women, Cities, and Grain Transportation.

Yelich introduced private member's motions to make sexually explicit material contraband in prisons, keep open local weather stations, establish a report on decorum in the House, and support research on endometriosis.

In 2015, Yelich lost the Conservative party nomination for the newly created riding of Saskatoon—Grasswood, essentially the Saskatoon portion of her old riding, to local sports broadcaster Kevin Waugh.

References

External links
 
 

1953 births
Canadian Alliance MPs
Canadian people of Croatian descent
Conservative Party of Canada MPs
Living people
Members of the House of Commons of Canada from Saskatchewan
Members of the King's Privy Council for Canada
Politicians from Saskatoon
Women members of the House of Commons of Canada
Members of the 28th Canadian Ministry
Women government ministers of Canada
21st-century Canadian women politicians